The Power is a novel by Ian Watson published in 1987.

Plot summary
The Power is a novel in which the apocalypse occurs after arguments about nuclear bases and peace camps.

Reception
Dave Langford reviewed The Power for White Dwarf #96, and stated that "for all his acuteness, Watson isn't immune to this genre's habitual gloating tone of 'Look, Mummy, see how disgusting I can be....'"

Reviews
Review by Michael Fearn (1987) in Vector 141

References

1987 novels